"Fool Again" is a song by Irish boy band Westlife. It was released on 27 March 2000 as the fifth and last single from their self-titled debut album (1999). The song debuted and peaked at number two in the band's native Ireland, making it the first Westlife song not to top the Irish chart. It became the band's fifth consecutive UK number-one single and spent 12 weeks on charts. To date, it has sold over 215,000 copies in UK, and it is the band's 14th-best-selling single in paid-for sales as well as their 13th-best-selling single in combined sales as of January 2019.

Composition
"Fool Again" was composed in the traditional verse–chorus form in E major, with Filan and Feehily's vocal ranging from the chords of B3 to A5.

Music video
The video for the single was filmed in Mexico City.

Track listings
UK CD single
 "Fool Again" (2000 remix)
 "Tunnel of Love"
 "Fool Again" (enhanced section)

UK cassette single and European CD single
 "Fool Again" (2000 remix)
 "Tunnel of Love"

Credits and personnel
Credits are lifted from the UK CD single and Westlife liner notes.

Studios
 Recorded and mixed at Cheiron Studios (Stockholm, Sweden)
 Strings recorded at Soundtrade Studios (Stockholm, Sweden)
 Mastered at Cutting Room (Stockholm, Sweden)

Personnel

 Jörgen Elofsson – writing
 Per Magnusson – writing, keyboards, production, arrangement, programming
 David Kreuger – writing, arrangement, programming
 Andreas Carlsson – additional backing vocals
 Anders von Hofsten – additional backing vocals
 Esbjörn Öhrwall – acoustic and electric guitars
 Mats Berntoft – acoustic and electric guitars
 John Doe – drums
 Gustave Lund – percussion
 Ulf & Henrik Janson – string arrangement
 David Kreuger – production
 Ronny Lahti – mixing
 Björn Engelmann – mastering

Charts

Weekly charts

Year-end charts

Certifications and sales

References

External links
 Official Westlife website

1999 songs
2000 singles
Bertelsmann Music Group singles
Number-one singles in Scotland
RCA Records singles
Songs written by David Kreuger
Songs written by Jörgen Elofsson
Songs written by Per Magnusson
UK Singles Chart number-one singles
Westlife songs
Music videos shot in Mexico